Caunsall is a hamlet in Worcestershire, England a few miles to the north of Kidderminster and close to the villages of Kinver, Cookley and Wolverley. It lies on the River Stour, and the Staffordshire and Worcestershire Canal.

External links

 Stourbridge.com - River Stour
 Staffordshire and Worcestershire Canal Society
 Canal Junction - S&W Canal

Villages in Worcestershire